Jhonny González Vera (born September 15, 1981) is a Mexican professional boxer. He is a three-time former world champion in two weight classes, having held the WBO bantamweight title from 2005 to 2007, and the WBC featherweight title twice between 2011 and 2015. Additionally, he held the IBO featherweight title from 2010 to 2011.

The name "Jhonny" originated as a misspelling of "Johnny" on his birth registration form.

Professional career

Bantamweight
On October 29, 2005, González defeated Ratanachai Sor Vorapin by a technical knockout in the seventh round, for the WBO bantamweight championship. On May 27, 2006, he defended it successfully against Fernando Montiel with a 2-1 split decision.

Super bantamweight
While still holding the title he won from Sor Vorapin, Gonzalez went up in weight and attempted to capture the WBC super-bantamweight title on September 16, 2006. However, he lost to Israel Vázquez by a knockout and chose to return to bantamweight.

His second defense of his WBO bantamweight title was also successful when González beat former IBF flyweight champ Irene Pacheco on March 30, 2007. On his third defense however, González was dethroned by 35-year-old Gerry Penalosa, who knocked him out in the 7th round on August 11, 2007.

On May 23, 2009, González challenged Toshiaki Nishioka for the WBC Super Bantamweight Title in Monterrey, Mexico. González downed Nishioka in Round 1 but eventually lost by KO in Round 3, failing in his attempt to capture the Title.

After the fight against Nishioka, Gonzalez decide to change his team, he had always been trained by his father "Miguel Angel "Raton" Gonzalez", but now he is under the lessons of Ignacio Beristáin.

Featherweight
Gonzalez then decided to abandon the super bantamweight category and start visualizing himself like a featherweight world champion.

Gonzalez won the WBC International Featherweight title on December 16, 2009, against Marlon Aguilar. The fight took place at the Auditorio Plaza Condesa in Mexico City. Gonzales won the bout by TKO in round 4 and following these events, he looked for a new attempt to become a Mexican world champion. On March 20, 2010, Gonzales took on Antonio Davis at the City Discothèque in Cancun, Quintana Roo, in a WBC Featherweight Title Eliminator; the former WBO champion won by technical knockout in the second round, when the referee stopped the fight after Davis failed to respond following four consecutive knockdowns.

In his next bout, González fought Colombian Aristides Perez for the WBC FECARBOX featherweight title. González indicated that he had been training hard for the upcoming bout, seeking for a world title shot. The Mexican was originally scheduled to fight Ira Terry, but the latter was replaced by Perez just a few days before the contest. The event was held in Campeche, Mexico, on July 24, 2010. The Pachuca native won the match by TKO in the second round, after knocking Perez down a few moments before.

González challenged Jackson Asiku on September 15, 2010, at the Hilton Hotel in Las Vegas, with the IBO Featherweight title on the line. The Mexican pugilist defeated his opponent by TKO in the 6th round, to win the IBO Featherweight title.

WBC featherweight champion
González visited Japan in an unstable situation after the Sendai earthquake to win the WBC Featherweight Championship via a fourth round technical knockout over Hozumi Hasegawa as a mandatory challenger at the World Memorial Hall in Kobe on April 8, 2011.

After defending his title four times, Gonzalez lost to Daniel Ponce de Leon in a technical decision on September 14, 2012. The fight went to the judges after eight rounds when Gonzalez could not continue due to an accidental headbutt. Gonzalez had been knocked down in the 6th round.

Gonzalez won back the WBC Featherweight title with a first round TKO over the heavily favored undefeated champion Abner Mares on August 24, 2013.

He defended the title twice before being knocked out by American Gary Russell in 4 rounds in Las Vegas.

Professional boxing record

Personal life
González married professional wrestler Dulce García, better known as Sexy Star, in June 2015.

See also
List of WBC world champions
List of Mexican boxing world champions

References

Video references

External links

1981 births
Bantamweight boxers
Living people
Boxers from Hidalgo (state)
Sportspeople from Pachuca
World Boxing Organization champions
World bantamweight boxing champions
Mexican male boxers
World Boxing Council champions
Super-bantamweight boxers
Featherweight boxers
Super-featherweight boxers
International Boxing Organization champions